The Kansas City Cowboys were a professional baseball team based in Kansas City, Missouri that played in the American Association for two seasons from 1888 to 1889. The franchise initially used Association Park as their home field in 1888, then moved to Exposition Park for the 1889 season.

The team began the 1888 season with part-time outfielder Dave Rowe as their player-manager. He was released from the team after beginning the season with a win–loss record of 14–36 though 50 games. He was replaced with second baseman Sam Barkley, who did not improve the team's play, winning 22 of the next 58 games. He was replaced with non-playing manager Bill Watkins, who finished the season. Although the Cowboys completed their initial season in last place out of the league's eight teams, there were notable player achievements; on June 6, Henry Porter threw a no-hitter, and on June 13, Barkley hit for the cycle.

The franchise's only future Hall of Fame player, "Slidin' Billy" Hamilton, began his career as a part-time outfielder in 1888, and was their starting right fielder in 1889.  He is the franchise's all-time leader in runs scored, bases on balls, and stolen bases.  With Watkins as the team's manager in 1889, the team improved their win–loss record to 55–82, with two ties, finishing seventh among the league's eight teams. On November 15, 1889, the Cowboys submitted their resignation from the AA and joined the Western Association as the Kansas City Blues for the 1890 season.

Players

References

External links
Franchise index at Baseball-Reference and Retrosheet

Major League Baseball all-time rosters